Purkan may refer to:
 Purkan, Alborz
 Purkan, Kerman
 Purkan, Yazd

See also
 Parkan, Iran (disambiguation)
 Purgan (disambiguation)